One of the dialects of the Maltese language is the Qormi dialect. Literally translated,  is the Maltese word for 'you know'. This dialect is used by many of the inhabitants of Qormi and other settlements around that city of around 20,000 people. The most distinctive feature of the Qormi dialect is its treatment of vowels.

Although there is no strict rule, generally the vowels in the dialect take the following forms. Vowels in the first syllables are the ones most often affected, but sometimes medial vowels are changed as well. Final vowels, on the other hand, are usually identical to those of the standard language.

The vowel A

The vowel a changes into the vowel /u/. If at the end of a word, it becomes an /o/.

The vowel O

The vowel o in the Qormi dialect also changes into /u/. For example:

This form happens to almost all words that have the vowel o in the first syllable, although there may be exceptions.

Vowels after Għ

The vowels after the għ change their sound as well.
The syllable għi, instead of as /aj/, is pronounced as /ej/. For example, in the dialect, għid il-kbir 'Easter' is pronounced like ejd il-kbir instead of ajd il-kbir in the standard.
The syllable għe, instead of with /e/, is pronounced with /a/. For example, in the dialect, qiegħed 'to stay' is pronounced like qijad instead of qijed in the standard.
The syllable għu, instead of as /ow/, is pronounced as /ew/. For example, in the dialect, għuda 'piece of wood' is pronounced like ewda instead of owda in the standard.

Exceptions
Although there may be exceptions, such as kollha 'all of it', which is pronounced like killha in the dialect, and meta 'when' like mita, one must note that the vowels are almost never lengthened, and their accent remains the normal Maltese one.

Dialects of Maltese
Qormi